Captive Girl is the fourth Jungle Jim film produced by Columbia Pictures. It was directed by William Berke and starred Johnny Weissmuller as the title character. It was also Weissmuller's second teaming with his fellow former Tarzan and Olympic Gold Medal swimming champion Buster Crabbe after Swamp Fire (1946). The film was the only feature film appearance of Anita Lhoest who was a swimming champion and cellist.

Plot
Jungle Jim is summoned to go to a different jungle area for a twin mission.  He is to escort Chief Mahala, returning after studying in the West, to regain the leadership of his tribe. His second mission is to investigate a mysterious blonde witch who has a pet tiger. It is believed the "witch" is actually Joan Martindale, the child of a long missing couple.  In his absence, Chief Mahala's leadership has been usurped by the evil witch doctor Hakim who seeks to kill the white witch.

A third factor is the evil treasure hunter Barton. Hakim keeps his power by making sacrifices of prisoners bound in gold chains and jewels who are thrown into the Lagoon of the Dead; these victims included the Martindales with Hakim seeking Joan to prevent her testifying against him after Mahala gains control of the tribe.  Using scuba gear, Barton seeks to gather the gold and jewels of the drowned victims for himself.

Cast
 Johnny Weissmuller as Jungle Jim 
 Buster Crabbe as Barton
 Anita Lhoest as Joan Martindale
 Rick Vallin as Chief Mahala
 John Dehner as Hakim
 Rusty Wescoatt as Silva
 Frank Lackteen as	Village Elder 
 Nelson Leigh as Reverend E.R. Holcom

References

External links

Review of film at Variety
Captive Girl at TCMDB

1950 films
Jungle Jim films
Columbia Pictures films
1950 adventure films
American adventure films
American black-and-white films
1950s English-language films
1950s American films
Films about witch doctors